Phase-change Dual (or Phase-change Disc) is a rewritable optical disc and a standard for it, developed by Matsushita Electric Industrial Co. , Ltd. in April 1995.

It has a capacity of 650 MB on one side, and the size of the disc is 12 cm in diameter (5 inches) similar to a general CD or DVD, and it is used in a state where it is housed in a square cartridge. The phase change recording technology using red laser light is adopted, and about 500,000 times of rewriting is possible.

The built-in PD drive and the external type are sold, respectively, and both of them can read the CD-ROM. Both drive and media, most of which are manufactured by Matsushita Electric Appliances only, the company also released a notebook PC with a 650 MB auxiliary storage device and a 4× CD-ROM drive, a PRONOTE PD (August 1996).

CD-RW can be cited as a re-writable medium at the same time, but it is characterized by being able to write and delete on a file basis, which is close to the feeling of handling CD-RW and floppy disk using packet write system. Also, due to the characteristics contained in the cartridge, it does not touch the recording surface directly, so it is resistant to dust and scratches and is relatively reliable. CD-R and CD-RW were not so popular at the time, and there were instabilities such as many write failures. Although the writing speed of PD is not fast, it is about to be faster than writing to floppy, but at the time of sale, it was not a speed that made it so difficult. 

Meanwhile, MO, ZIP drive, SyQuest, etc. existed as re-writable media close to the feeling of handling floppy disks, but the advantage that the PD drive can be read by the CD-ROM was merit compared with those. At that time the CD-ROM drive was becoming an essential peripheral device, but it was not necessarily built in every PC yet, desktop machines that were mainstream at that time had many models with only one drive bay. In such an environment, a PD capable of serving as both a CD-ROM drive and a large capacity (then) auxiliary storage device was advantageous both in terms of cost and installation.

DVD-RAM appeared as a successor technology in April 1997, DVD-RAM adopts a cartridge similar to PD, and the 2.6 GB version 1.0 standard, which has just one side capacity equal to 4 times the PD, DVD - It was possible to read and write PD in the RAM drive. However, in the summer of 2000, compatibility with PD was not taken into consideration when creating DVD-RAM version 2.0, which has the same with 4.7 GB standard capacity as other DVDs. At this point PD drives and media effectively disappeared from the market.

External links 

Computer-related introductions in 1995
120 mm discs
Japanese inventions